Bacillus gibsonii is a facultative anaerobe bacterium. It is a gram positive, alkaliphilic and alkalitolerant, aerobic endospore-forming bacteria.

This species has been recently transferred into the genus Alkalihalobacillus. The correct nomenclature is Alkalihalobacillus gibsonii.

References

External links
 UniProt entry
 Type strain of Bacillus gibsonii at BacDive -  the Bacterial Diversity Metadatabase

gibsonii